Peraustrínia 2004 is a Spanish animation movie. It is the first animated full-length feature to have been recorded entirely in Catalan.  It was directed by Ángel García and written by Joan Marimón.

References

External links
 

1990 films
Catalan-language films
1990 animated films
Spanish fantasy adventure films
1990s science fiction films
Spanish animated science fiction films
Spanish animated fantasy films
1990s Spanish films